The men's 3 m springboard competition at the 2013 European Diving Championships was held on June 20 with a preliminary round and the final.

Results
The preliminary round was held at 09:00 and the final was held at 15:30.

Green denotes finalists

References

2013 European Diving Championships